Maniltoa is a genus of flowering plants in the family Fabaceae.

It contains the following species:
 Maniltoa floribunda
 Maniltoa grandiflora
 Maniltoa lenticellata
 Maniltoa minor
 Maniltoa rosea
 Maniltoa vestita

It has been suggested that Maniltoa should be synonymized with Cynometra.

References

 
Fabaceae genera
Taxonomy articles created by Polbot